Gardner is a small lunar impact crater in the northeast part of the Moon and is named after an American physicist Irvine Clifton Gardner. It lies due east of the crater Vitruvius, in a section of rough terrain north of the Mare Tranquillitatis. Gardner was previously designated Vitruvius A before being given its present name by the IAU. To the northeast of Gardner is the larger crater Maraldi.

It is a circular crater with sloping inner walls and an interior floor that occupies about half the total crater diameter. The southern half of the floor has a slight rise before reaching the inner wall. The crater is not significantly eroded, and the outer rim is relatively sharp and well-defined.  The most distinctive feature is a row of four rounded hills along the northern floor of the crater.

To the south is an elevated area unofficially known as the Gardner Megadome. In the vicinity of the dome are satellite craters including Vitruvius B, H, and T, and Maraldi D.

References

External links
 LTO-43D4 Vitruvius — L&PI topographic map
Debris Flows in Gardner Crater - Lunar Reconnaissance Orbiter page with images

Related articles
  - also featuring the surrounding craters
 
 

Impact craters on the Moon